"Panzi", born Thom Hansen (born 1953) is an American homosexual activist.

Panzi may also refer to:

Panzi Hospital,  Bukavu, Democratic Republic of the Congo
Giuseppe Panzi (1734-before 1812), Jesuit painter